Tigran Gspeyan (born 12 October 1969) is a retired Armenian football defender.

References

1969 births
Living people
Soviet footballers
Armenian footballers
Soviet Armenians
FC Ararat Yerevan players
Erebuni-Homenmen FC players
Zvartnots-AAL FC players
Ulisses FC players
F.C. Ararat Tehran players
FC Shirak players
Tadamon Sour SC players
Association football defenders
Armenian expatriate footballers
Expatriate footballers in Iran
Armenian expatriate sportspeople in Iran
Expatriate footballers in Lebanon
Armenian expatriate sportspeople in Lebanon
Armenia international footballers
Lebanese Premier League players